Phyllosticta penicillariae is a fungal plant pathogen infecting pearl millet.

References

External links
 USDA ARS Fungal Database

Fungal plant pathogens and diseases
Pearl millet diseases
penicillariae
Fungi described in 1914